Angelique Kerber defeated the defending champion Serena Williams in the final, 6–4, 3–6, 6–4 to win the women's singles tennis title at the 2016 Australian Open. It was her first major title. Kerber saved a match point en route to the title, in the first round against Misaki Doi; she became the first woman to win a singles major after saving a match point in the first round. She also became the first German to win a major since Steffi Graf at the 1999 French Open. Williams was attempting to equal Graf's Open Era record of 22 major singles titles. Williams' loss also ended her eight-match winning streak in major finals.

The top three seeds (Williams, Simona Halep and Garbiñe Muguruza) were in contention for the world No. 1 ranking. However, Halep and Muguruza were eliminated in the first and third rounds, respectively, with Williams retaining the top spot at the end of the tournament.	

The twelve seeds that lost in the opening round were the most to do so at any major since the 32-seed draw was adopted at the 2001 Wimbledon Championships.

Zhang Shuai became the first qualifier to reach the quarterfinals since Angélica Gavaldón in 1990. Zhang also won her first main draw major match in her 15th main draw appearance.

This was the first major appearance for future two-time champion and world No. 1 Naomi Osaka, who lost to Victoria Azarenka in the third round. It was also the last professional event for former world No. 1 Maria Sharapova until the 2017 Porsche Tennis Grand Prix. Sharapova failed a drug test at this tournament, testing positive for the banned substance meldonium, and was suspended from professional tennis for 15 months as a result. She lost here in the quarterfinals to Williams, in a rematch of the previous year's final.

Seeds 

  Serena Williams (final)
  Simona Halep (first round)
  Garbiñe Muguruza (third round)
  Agnieszka Radwańska (semifinals)
  Maria Sharapova (quarterfinals)
  Petra Kvitová (second round)
  Angelique Kerber (champion)
  Venus Williams (first round)
  Karolína Plíšková (third round)
  Carla Suárez Navarro (quarterfinals)
  Timea Bacsinszky (second round)
  Belinda Bencic (fourth round)
  Roberta Vinci (third round)
  Victoria Azarenka (quarterfinals)
  Madison Keys (fourth round)
  Caroline Wozniacki (first round)

  Sara Errani (first round)
  Elina Svitolina (second round)
  Jelena Janković (second round)
  Ana Ivanovic (third round)
  Ekaterina Makarova (fourth round)
  Andrea Petkovic (first round)
  Svetlana Kuznetsova (second round)
  Sloane Stephens (first round)
  Samantha Stosur (first round)
  Anastasia Pavlyuchenkova (first round)
  Anna Karolína Schmiedlová (first round)
  Kristina Mladenovic (third round)
  Irina-Camelia Begu (first round)
  Sabine Lisicki (second round)
  Lesia Tsurenko (first round)
  Caroline Garcia (first round)

Qualifying

Wildcards

Draw

Finals

Top half

Section 1

Section 2

Section 3

Section 4

Bottom half

Section 5

Section 6

Section 7

Section 8

Championship match statistics

References
General

Women drawsheet on ausopen.com

Specific

External links
 2016 Australian Open – Women's draws and results at the International Tennis Federation

Women's Singles
2016
2016 in Australian women's sport
2016 WTA Tour